Ernesto Chan (July 27, 1940 – May 16, 2012), born and sometimes credited as Ernie Chua, was a [-Filipino]-American comics artist, known for work published by Marvel Comics and DC Comics, including many Marvel issues of series featuring Conan the Barbarian. Chan also had a long tenure on Batman and Detective Comics. Other than his work on Batman, Chan primarily focused on non-superhero characters, staying mostly in the genres of horror, war, and sword and sorcery.

Biography
Ernie Chan was born Ernie Chua due to what he called "a typographical error on my birth certificate that I had to use until I had a chance to change it to 'Chan' when I got my [U.S.] citizenship in '76." He migrated to the United States in 1970 and became a citizen in 1976. For a number of years, he worked under the name Ernie Chua but he was later credited as Ernie Chan. He studied with John Buscema and worked with him as the inker on Conan during the 1970s. He also inked the art of Buscema's brother Sal on The Incredible Hulk.

Chan entered the American comics industry in 1972 with DC Comics as a penciler on horror/mystery titles such as Ghosts, House of Mystery, and The Unexpected. By 1974, he was working regularly for Marvel Comics on Conan the Barbarian. From 1975–1976, Chan worked exclusively for DC including the artwork for Claw the Unconquered which was written by David Michelinie. While working on the Detective Comics series, he drew the first appearances of Captain Stingaree in issue #460 (June 1976) and the Black Spider in #463 (Sept. 1976). Under the name Chua, he was DC Comics' primary cover artist from approximately 1975 to 1977.

Chan pencilled several issues of Conan and Doctor Strange, and worked on Kull the Destroyer in 1977 and Power Man and Iron Fist in the 1980s. From about 1978 onward, he worked almost exclusively for Marvel and focused on Conan in the 1980s.

In the early 1990s he joined Sega, providing character design and art for video games such as Eternal Champions.

In 2002, he retired except for commissioned artwork but returned to comics to draw writer Andrew Zar's adult-oriented webcomic The Vat #1 in 2009.

Personal life
Chan was based in Oakland, California and had three children; his daughter Cleo Caron Chan was born April 25, 1978. Ernie Chan died on May 16, 2012 after a nearly yearlong battle with cancer.

Awards
Ernie Chan received an Inkpot Award in 1980.

Bibliography
Comics work (interior pencil art, except where noted) includes:

DarkBrain
The Vat (2009)

DC Comics

Adventure Comics (Spectre) #437–438; (Seven Soldiers of Victory) #441 (1975)
Batman #262–264, 267, 269–270, 273–283 (1975–1977)
Captain Carrot and His Amazing Zoo Crew! #18 (1983)
Claw the Unconquered #1–7 (1975–1976)
Dark Mansion of Forbidden Love #4 (1972)
DC Special Series (The Unexpected) #4 (1977)
Detective Comics (Elongated Man) #444; (Batman) #447–449, 451–453, 456, 458, 460–466 (1974–1976)
Forbidden Tales of Dark Mansion #8 (1972)
Ghosts #4, 10–11, 14, 21, 27, 30, 70 (1972–1978)
G.I. Combat #209 (1978)
House of Mystery #203, 251, 254–257, 290 (1972–1981)
House of Secrets #117, 124, 126, 129, 133, 137, 141, 143–144, 147–148 (1974–1977)
The Joker #3 (1975)
Jonah Hex #6–9 (1977–1978)
Kamandi #47, 49 (1976–1977)
Sandman #2–3 (1975)
Secret Society of Super Villains #4 (1976)
Secrets of Haunted House #1, 5 (1975–1976)
Secrets of Sinister House #16 (1974)
Superman (Fabulous World of Krypton) #282 (1974)
Swamp Thing #24 (1976)
Tales of Ghost Castle #3 (1975)
Teen Titans (Lilith) #43 (1973)
The Unexpected #134, 146, 149, 151, 170, 182, 188 (1972–1978)
Weird Mystery Tales #14 (1974)
Weird War Tales #17, 24, 26, 29–30, 42, 44, 49, 53–54, 58–59 (1973–1978)
The Witching Hour #40, 62 (1974–1976)
World's Finest Comics (Superman and  Batman) #242 (1976)

Marvel Comics

Captain Marvel #24 (1973)
Chamber of Chills #3 (1973)
Conan the Barbarian #87, Annual #9–11 (full art); #26–36, 40–43, 70–86, 88–118, 131, 134, 142, 144, 147–153, 156–157, 168, 175, 177–178, 181–185, 187–190, 249–250, 252, 254, 275 (inks over John Buscema, Howard Chaykin, Gil Kane and Mike Doherty, 1973–1993)
Daredevil #96–98 (inks over Gene Colan pencils, 1973)
Doc Savage #2 (inks over Ross Andru pencils, 1972)
Doc Savage vol. 2 #8 (1977)
Doctor Strange vol. 2 #27–29 (inks over Tom Sutton pencils, 1978)
Haunt of Horror #1 (1974)
King Conan #5, 10 (1981–1982)
Kull the Conqueror vol. 2 #4 (1984)
Kull the Destroyer #21–29 (1977–1978)
Marvel Comics Presents (Starfox) #65 (1990)
Marvel Two-in-One #35–36 (1978)
Power Man and Iron Fist #94–100 (1983)
Savage Sword of Conan #29, 35, 68, 71, 76, 111, 113, 116, 119, 122–123, 137, 155, 158, 160–161, 164, 172–173, 177, 179, 183, 185, 187, 212, 214, 227 (full art); #62–64, 66, 71–72, 77–79, 81, 87, 95, 99–100, 102, 104, 108–109, 132-135, 137–142, 144, 146–148, 150–152, 166–169, 178–179, 185, 191–200, 202–206, 212 (inks over John Buscema, Ernie Colón, Val Mayerik, Mike Docherty, Gary Kwapisz) (1978–1994)
Spider-Woman #29 (1980)
Tales of the Zombie #4 (1974)
Thor #336 (1983)

Warren Publishing
 Creepy #88 (1977)

References

External links

  
 
 
 Ernie Chan at Mike's Amazing World of Comics
 Ernie Chan ("Ernie Chua") at the Unofficial Handbook of Marvel Comics Creators

1940 births
2012 deaths
20th-century Chinese male artists
21st-century Chinese male artists
American comics artists
Comics inkers
DC Comics people
Deaths from cancer in California
Chinese comics artists
Filipino emigrants to the United States
Inkpot Award winners
Marvel Comics people
Video game artists